United College, formerly known as St. Paul's University College, is a university college affiliated with the University of Waterloo in Waterloo, Ontario, Canada. The college contributes to the University of Waterloo by offering academic programming which is reflective of its mission and values. It provides an enriched living environment for both graduate and undergraduate students; and  hosts unique co-curricular programming for University of Waterloo students such as GreenHouse, the Waterloo Indigenous Student Centre, and the Student Refugee Program.

History
The college was founded by the United Church of Canada in 1962 as St. Paul's United College. It opened its doors to students in 1963. The Church and the college agreed to end their formal relationship in 2005 and the name of the institution was changed to St. Paul's University College. In 2022, the name of the institution was changed to United College.

Residences

The undergraduate residences at United College are home to approximately 340 students from the University of Waterloo, drawn from all faculties. The majority of undergraduate residents are in first-year and almost all first-year students are accommodated in double rooms. The undergraduate residences host a number of living-learning communities that cluster students by academic interest.  The college currently has residential clusters focused on Human Rights, Environment, Women-in-Engineering, and Financial Assessment and Risk Management.  There are also special residence communities for Indigenous students and for those who wish to speak French.

United College is also home to an apartment building for graduate students at  the University of Waterloo. The building has approximately eighty units and hosts MA and PhD students from all faculties.

Academic programs
Through its agreement of affiliation with the University of Waterloo, United College hosts academic programs in Canadian Studies, Indigenous Studies, Human Rights, and Indigenous Entrepreneurship. United College also shares in the delivery of University of Waterloo academic programming in International Development and Religious Studies. The common thread in the college's academic programming is the objective of bringing people together to make the world more humane and more equitable.

Waterloo Indigenous Student Centre
United College hosts the Waterloo Indigenous Student Centre (WISC). The WISC is a friendly home for the university's Indigenous students, supporting them in a variety of ways.

GreenHouse
The University of Waterloo is known for its excellence in innovation and entrepreneurship. GreenHouse is a social impact incubator that provides students from all faculties with training in design thinking and entrepreneurship to enable them to apply what they've learned in the academic programs to make positive social or environmental change.

Name change and re-brand 
In September 2022, United College formally announced its decision to re-brand from its former name, St Paul's University College. The former colour scheme, green and brown, was changed to blue and black, and the logo became a blue 'U'. The name change was motivated by the college's desire to let go of its previous religious affiliation. Principal Rick Myers explained the name change by stating, "It's a beautiful name that speaks to the inclusive values of today's College while still honouring those responsible for its founding and early development."

Principals
Rick Myers (2016–present)
Graham Brown (1999–2016)
Helga Mills (1994–1999)
William Klassen (1989–1994)
François Gerard (1978–1988)
Alan M. McLachlin (1965–1977)
Douglas J. Hall (1962–1965)

Chancellors 
Michaelle Jean (2020 – present) 
J.P. Gladu (2017– 2020) 
Lloyd Axworthy (2014–2017)

References

External links

1962 establishments in Ontario
Educational institutions established in 1962
United Church of Canada
University of Waterloo buildings